This is a list of Estonian football transfers in the winter transfer window 2020–21 by club.

This transfer window is open between the 2020 Meistriliiga and the 2021 Meistriliiga season. 1 club has changed: Pärnu JK Vaprus joins Estonian top division, while JK Tallinna Kalev was relegated.

Meistriliiga

Flora

In:

Out:

Paide Linnameeskond

In:

Out:

FCI Levadia

In:

Out:

Nõmme Kalju

In:

Out:

Tartu Tammeka

In:

Out:

Viljandi Tulevik

In:

Out:

Tallinna Legion

In:

Out:

Narva Trans

In:

Out:

Kuressaare

In:

Out:

Pärnu Vaprus

In:

Out:

References

External links
 Official site of the Estonian Football Association
 Official site of the Meistriliiga

Estonian
transfers
transfers
2020–21